Adventure  was a 26-gun galley in the service of the English Navy Royal. She spent her early career in expeditions as far as West Indies, Cadiz and the Azores. She later was assigned to the Channel Guard during two more attempts by Philip II of Spain to invade England. She would spend the rest of her time in Home Waters, mainly the English Channel and North Sea. She was broken in 1645.

Adventure  was the first named vessel in the English and Royal Navies.

Construction and specifications
She was built on the Thames at Deptford Dockyard under the guidance of Master Shipwright Matthew Baker. She was launched in 1594. Her tonnage was between 274.6 and 343.2 tons.

Her gun armament was in 1603 18 guns consisting of four culverins, eleven demi-culverines, five sakers plus two fowlers. In 1624 her armament was listed as twelve demi-culverines, six sakers, six minions plus four fowlers. Her manning was around 120 officers and men in 1603.

Commissioned service
She was commissioned in 1595 under Captain Thomas Drake, followed by Captain Henry Savile for service with Sir Francis Drake and Sir John Hawkyns expedition to the West Indies. Both Hawkins and Drake would be killed there. In 1597 she was under Captain Sir George Carew for an expedition to the Azores. In 1599 under Captain George Somers on the Irish Station. Captain Sir Alexander Clifford was her commander with the Channel Guard in 1599. In 1602 she was under Captain Sackville Trevor with Sir Richard Leveson's Squadron in an attack on Cezimbra on 3 June 1602. Later in 1602 she was under Captain Thomas Norreys with Sir William Monson's squadron. During 1611-1612 she was under command of Captain Sir William Monson for service in the English Channel.

She was in commission in the summer of 1623 under the command of Captain Richard Bingley. The next time she was incommission was 1626 under the command of Captain George Alleyne. She was off the Dutch coast at the capture of Saint Esprit in October 1627. She was repaired at Deptford between December 1627 and 1628. In November 1628 Captain John Mennes was in command, She was again in commission under Captain Richard Paramore (took command on 30 March 1635) sailing with Lindsey's Fleet in the Channel. Ayear later on 30 March 1636 she was under command of Captain Thomas Price sailing with Northumberland's Fleet in the Channel. Her last commander was Captain J. Hall in 1638. In November 1638 she was reported to be old, leaky and rotten. She was laid up at Chatham.

Disposition
Adventure was broken by Admiralty Ordered (AO) 2 November 1645.

Notes

Citations

References
 British Warships in the Age of Sail (1603 – 1714), by Rif Winfield, published by Seaforth Publishing, England © Rif Winfield 2009, EPUB , Chapter 4, The Fourth Rates - 'Small Ships', Vessels in service or on order at 24 March 1603, Adventure
 Ships of the Royal Navy, by J.J. Colledge, revised and updated by Lt-Cdr Ben Warlow and Steve Bush, published by Seaforth Publishing, Barnsley, Great Britain, © the estate of J.J. Colledge, Ben Warlow and Steve Bush 2020, EPUB , Section A (Adventure)
 The Arming and Fitting of English Ships of War 1600 - 1815, by Brian Lavery, published by US Naval Institute Press © Brian Lavery 1989, Part V Guns, Type of Guns

 

Ships of the Royal Navy
16th-century ships